Clanculus buijsei is a species of sea snail, a marine gastropod mollusk in the family Trochidae, the top snails.

Description
The length of an adult shell is 11 mm.

Distribution
This species occurs in the Pacific Ocean off the Philippines.

References

 Poppe G.T., Tagaro S.P. & Dekker H. (2006) The Seguenziidae, Chilodontidae, Trochidae, Calliostomatidae and Solariellidae of the Philippine Islands. Visaya Supplement 2: 1–228. page(s): 70

External links
 

buijsei
Gastropods described in 2006